is a short-legged table used in traditional Japanese homes. The original chabudai ranged in height
from just 15 cm to a maximum height of 30 cm. People seated at a chabudai may sit on zabuton or tatami rather than on chairs. The four legs of a chabudai are generally collapsible so that the table may be moved and stored easily.

Chabudai are used for various purposes, such as study tables, work benches, or dinner tables. In the winter, the chabudai is often replaced by a kotatsu, another type of short-legged table equipped with a removable top and a heater underneath.

Chabudai gaeshi
Chabudai gaeshi is a Japanese phrase meaning to flip [the] chabudai. It describes the act of violently upending a chabudai as an expression of anger, frustration, and disapproval. Chabudai gaeshi may also figuratively describe an analogous outburst and upheaval. 

Video game designer Shigeru Miyamoto "upends the tea table" whenever a game's development didn't meet his standard or needed serious reconsideration. He characterized chabudai gaeshi as an "action of old-fashioned Japanese fathers" that "would destroy the family" if attempted literally in modern Japanese society.

A Japanese arcade game, Cho Chabudai Gaeshi, is based upon the scenario of chabudai gaeshi.

See also
Coffee table
Housing in Japan
Kotatsu

References

External links
Glass Table Tops

Tables (furniture)
Japanese home
Portable furniture